This page lists the results of leadership elections held by the many iterations of a "Conservative Party" in Quebec.

Conservative Party of Quebec (1867-1936)
Prior to 1929, leaders were chosen by the caucus.

1929 leadership convention

(Held on July 10, 1929)

Camillien Houde acclaimed

1933 leadership convention

(Held on October 4, 1933)

Maurice Duplessis 334
Onésime Gagnon 216

Conservative Party of Quebec (2009-present)

2013 leadership convention

(Held on February 23, 2013)

Adrien Pouliot (acclaimed)

2021 leadership convention

(Held on April 17, 2021)

References

See also
Leadership convention

Political party leadership elections in Quebec
Conservatism-related lists